The Haib mine is a proposed copper mine located in the south of Namibia in the ǁKaras Region. Haib represents one of the largest copper reserves in Namibia, having estimated reserves of 2 billion tonnes of ore grading 0.37% copper. The mine is accessible by an 12km access road off the B1 road.

The mine is owned by the Canada-based Deep-South Resources, Inc., through its subsidiary, Haib Minerals. Deep-South finished acquiring the mine in 2017 from Teck Resources, in exchange for Teck owning a 35% stake in Deep-South. As of 2021, the mine is in the prospecting stage, with the Supreme Court of Namibia ruling that the company could renew its permit.

References 

Copper mines in Namibia
Buildings and structures in ǁKaras Region